Cesare Bettarini (17 October 1901 – 19 October 1975) was an Italian film actor. He appeared in a number of productions during the Fascist era, including the 1935 drama Like the Leaves (1935).

Selected filmography
 The Wedding March (1934)
 Like the Leaves (1935)
 Destiny (1938)
 Naples Will Never Die (1939)
 The Adventures of Fra Diavolo (1942)
 That Ghost of My Husband (1950)
 Son of the Hunchback (1952)
 Martin Toccaferro (1953)
 A Day in Court (1954)
 Move and I'll Shoot (1958)

References

Bibliography 
 Caldiron, Orio. Isa Miranda. Gremese Editore, 1978.

External links 
 

1901 births
1975 deaths
Italian male film actors
Italian male stage actors
Actors from Florence
20th-century Italian male actors